Jagtial is a city and the district headquarters of jagtial district of Telangana, India.

Notable people
Duvvasi Mohan Actor and comedian in Telugu cinema

Venu Sriram Film director in Tollywood 

Harish Shankar  Film director in Tollywood

Alishetti Prabhakar, writer and painter

T Jeevan Reddy politician, MLC, Ex R&B Minister

L Ramana politician from TRS Party, MLC

Educational Institutions
 JNTUH College of Engineering Jagtial, located in Nachupally Jagtiyal
 Prof Jayashankar Agriculture University college of Jagtiyal
NAAC National Academy of Construction
Government Medical College Jagtiyal
Government Nursing College Jagtiyal
SKNR Government Degree college 
Government women's Degree college
Government Intermediate Junior College
NSV Educational Institutions KG to PG

Transport

Road
NH 61 Bhiwandi Ahmednagar Nanded Nirmal Jagtial

NH 63 Latur Nizamabad Jagtial Mancherial Bijapur Jagdalpur

NH 563 Jagtial Karimnagar Warangal Khammam

Railway
There is a railway station at Jagtiyal which is a part of the Peddapalli-Nizambad line

References 

Cities and towns in Jagtial district
Mandals in Jagtial district